Curto Circuito, is a Portuguese talk show created in 1999 by Rui Unas and Pedro Miguel Paiva that airs on SIC Radical and SIC K.

Presenters

External links
 Official website 

1999 Portuguese television series debuts
Portuguese television talk shows
Sociedade Independente de Comunicação original programming
1990s Portuguese television series
2000s Portuguese television series
2010s Portuguese television series